Luzarinaeis a subfamily of crickets in the family Phalangopsidae.

Subdivisions 
The Orthoptera Species File lists the following taxonomy for Luzarinae:

 subtribe Amphiacustina Hubbell, 1938
 Amphiacusta Saussure, 1874
 Arachnopsita Desutter-Grandcolas & Hubbell, 1993
 †Araneagryllus Heads, 2010
 Cantrallia Desutter-Grandcolas, 1994
 Caribacusta Gorochov, 2014
 Leptopedetes Desutter-Grandcolas, 1994
 Longuripes Desutter-Grandcolas & Hubbell, 1993
 Mayagryllus Desutter-Grandcolas & Hubbell, 1993
 Nemoricantor Desutter-Grandcolas & Hubbell, 1993
 Noctivox Desutter-Grandcolas & Hubbell, 1993
 subtribe Lernecina Desutter-Grandcolas, 1987
 Lerneca Walker, 1869
 Lernecopsis de Mello, 1995
 Microlerneca de Mello, 1995
 Prosthacusta Saussure, 1874
 subtribe Luzarina Hebard, 1928
 Acantoluzarida Desutter-Grandcolas, 1992
 Allochrates Desutter-Grandcolas, 1993
 Amazonacla Gorochov, 2011
 Amusina Hebard, 1928
 Amusodes Hebard, 1928
 Dyscophogryllus Rehn, 1901
 Gryllosoma Hebard, 1928
 Koilenoma Desutter-Grandcolas, 1993
 Lecticusta Cadena-Castañeda & García García, 2012
 Leptopsis Desutter-Grandcolas, 1996
 Luzara Walker, 1869
 Luzarida Hebard, 1928
 Luzaridella Desutter-Grandcolas, 1992
 Megalamusus Hebard, 1928
 Melanotes Desutter-Grandcolas, 1993
 Niquirana Hebard, 1928
 Ochraperites Desutter-Grandcolas, 1993
 Palpigera Hebard, 1928
 Peru Koçak & Kemal, 2008
 Peruzara Gorochov, 2011
 Rehniella Hebard, 1928
 Tairona Hebard, 1928
 Ucayacla Gorochov, 2011
 genus group Aracambiae Souza-Dias & Desutter-Grandcolas, 2014
 Aracamby de Mello, 1992
 Cacruzia de Mello, 1992
 Desutterella Souza-Dias, Campos & de Mello, 2017
 Izecksohniella de Mello, 1992
 Marcgraviella Souza-Dias & Desutter-Grandcolas, 2014
 Marliella Mews & Mól, 2009
 Vanzoliniella de Mello & Cezar dos Reis, 1994
 genera without subtribe or other placement
 Adenopygus Bolfarini & de Mello, 2012
 Anacusta Hebard, 1928
 Bambuina de Mello, Horta & Bolfarini, 2013
 Cophella Hebard, 1928
 Grandcolasia Koçak & Kemal, 2010
 Guabamima de Mello, 1993
 Joadis Mews & Sperber, 2009
 Mellomima Desutter-Grandcolas, 2020
 Mellopsis Mews & Sperber, 2010
 Miogryllodes Hebard, 1928
 Ottedana de Mello & de Andrade, 2003
 Paracophella Hebard, 1928
 Pizacris Souza-Dias & Desutter-Grandcolas, 2015
 Prosthama Hebard, 1928
 Saopauloa Koçak & Kemal, 2008
 Sishiniheia de Mello & Souza-Dias, 2016
 Strinatia Chopard, 1970

References 

Crickets
Orthoptera subfamilies